Cruel Summer may refer to:

Film and television
 Cruel Summer (film), a short film by American musician Kanye West
 Cruel Summer, a 2016 film starring Danny Miller
 Cruel Summer (TV series), an American TV series on Freeform

Music
 Cruel Summer (Bananarama song)
 Cruel Summer (Taylor Swift song)
 Cruel Summer (Ace of Base album)
 Cruel Summer (GOOD Music album), featuring artists from the record label of Kanye West